The Sons of Utah Pioneers and Daughters of Utah Pioneers have erected many monuments throughout the west commemorating historic moments. The following is a detail of the monuments.

References

 

Buildings and structures in San Diego County, California
Buildings and structures in San Bernardino County, California
Buildings and structures in El Dorado County, California
Buildings and structures in Mohave County, Arizona
Buildings and structures in Apache County, Arizona
Buildings and structures in Coconino County, Arizona
Buildings and structures in Maricopa County, Arizona
Buildings and structures in Graham County, Arizona
Buildings and structures in Pinal County, Arizona
Buildings and structures in Fresno County, California